Siedliska  is a village in the administrative district of Gmina Lubenia, within Rzeszów County, Podkarpackie Voivodeship, in south-eastern Poland.

The village has a population of 1,700.

Notable personalities
Siedliska is the birthplace of Father Józef Kowalski of the Salesian Society, the martyr of Auschwitz concentration camp beatified by Pope John Paul II on June 13, 1999, at a ceremonial mass in Warsaw.

References

Villages in Rzeszów County